Alcadia conuloides is a species of tropical land snail with an operculum, a terrestrial gastropod mollusk in the family Helicinidae.

Taxonomy 
Robert John Lechmere Guppy (1895) considered this species synonymous with the taxon Schrammia schrammia (Crosse, 1872) from Guadeloupe, but that species is larger and higher-spired, and therefore Guppy's name was resurrected. Horace Burrington Baker (1927) suggested that Guppy's species probably belongs in the genus Alcadia, subgenus Idesa. Until the status of Schrammia and its two species can be resolved, we follow the last published work, that of Baker (1927).

Distribution
This species is endemic to the West Indian island of  Dominica.

Ecology 
This small species lives on wet leaves, being particularly active after rainfall, and on damp leaf litter. It is believed to feed on encrusting algae.

References
This article incorporates CC-BY-3.0 text from the reference.

Helicinidae
Endemic fauna of Dominica
Gastropods described in 1868